Mitákuye Oyás’iŋ (All Are Related) is a phrase from the Lakota language. It reflects the world view of interconnectedness held by the Lakota people of North America. This concept and phrase is expressed in many Yankton Sioux prayers, as well as by ceremonial people in other Lakota communities.

The phrase translates in English as "all my relatives," "we are all related," or "all my relations."  It is a prayer of oneness and harmony with all forms of life: other people, animals, birds, insects, trees and plants, and even rocks, rivers, mountains and valleys.

From work in the 1940s, American scholar Joseph Epes Brown wrote a study of Mitákuye Oyás’iŋ and its relevance in the Sioux ideology of "underlying connection" and "oneness.”

-url=https://web.archive.org/web/20170222134353/http://www.lakotacountrytimes.com/common/PastArchives/1237.html|url-status=dead|archive-date=22 February 2017|website=Lakota Country Times|publisher=Lakota Country Times|access-date=25 February 2017}}</ref>

References

Lakota mythology
Native American religion
Prayer
Slogans
Lakota words and phrases